Henry Winter (born 18 February 1963) is an English sports journalist. He is currently the Chief Football Writer for The Times, and previously a Football Correspondent for The Daily Telegraph.

Education 
Winter was educated at Westminster School, before graduating from the University of Edinburgh in 1986.

Career
Winter spent a year producing a magazine on sport in London after graduation before joining The Independent at its launch in 1986, writing a sports and schools column.

He moved to The Daily Telegraph in 1994, and produced a daily webcast on the 2006 FIFA World Cup in Germany, giving specific information on the England team. He joined The Times in 2015 to become Chief Football Writer.

Over the course of his career, Winter wrote FA Confidential with former FA chief executive David Davies, and ghost-wrote the autobiographies of Liverpool F.C. players Kenny Dalglish, John Barnes and Steven Gerrard. He wrote Fifty Years of Hurt: The Story of England Football in 2017.

He also makes regular appearances as a pundit on Sky Sports' Sunday Supplement and BBC Radio 5 Live.

Awards 
Winter was named Specialist Correspondent of the Year at the British Sports Journalism Awards in 2004, 2009, 2010 and 2013, and Football Writer of the Year in 2016. In 2010, he was named among the top 10 most influential sportswriters in Britain by the trade publication, Press Gazette.

Personal life
Winter's older brother is academic Timothy Winter. He is a trustee of the African social enterprise Alive & Kicking, which manufactures footballs in Kenya and Zambia.

References

External links
Henry Winter on Twitter
Podcast interview on sports journalism and social media

1963 births
Living people
English male non-fiction writers
English male journalists
English sportswriters
The Independent people
The Daily Telegraph people
The Times journalists
People educated at Westminster School, London
Writers from London
Alumni of the University of Edinburgh